Steel is a surname. Notable people with the surname include:

A. G. Steel (1858–1914), English cricketer
Ace Steel
Alan Steel
Alex Steel
Amy Steel (actress)
Amy Steel (netball)
Anthony Steel (actor)
Anthony Steel (arts leader)
Anthony Steel (historian)
Arthur Steel-Maitland
Barbara Steel (1857–1943), Scottish-South African suffragette
Belle Steel
Ben Steel
Bill Steel
Billy Steel (1923–1982), Scottish footballer
Bobby Steel
Bruce Steel
Brynjolf Steel
Bryan Steel (born 1969), English cyclist and multiple Olympic medallist
Cameron Steel
Catherine Steel
Charles Steel
Chris Steel
Christine Steel
Christopher Steel (1938–1991), British composer
Sir Christopher Steel (diplomat) (1903–1973), British ambassador
Cynthia Dianne Steel
Danielle Steel (born 1947), American author known for her romance novels
Danny Steel
David Steel (politician)
Dawn Steel (1946–1997), one of the first women to run a major Hollywood film studio
Dick Steel (born 1930), English professional footballer
"Doctor Steel", American musician heading an alternative band
Dorothy Steel
Douglas Steel
Duncan Steel (born 1955), British/Australian astrophysicist
Duncan G. Steel
Elizabeth Steel
Elliot Steel
Eric Steel
Flora Annie Steel (1847–1929), English writer
Fred Steel
Freda Steel, Manitoba judge
Gary Steel
Geoff Steel
George Steel (musician)
George Steel (Manitoba politician)
Georgia Steel (born 1998), English television personality
Harold Steel
Harry Steel (disambiguation), various people
Heather Steel
Henry Steel Olcott (1832–1907), American military officer and journalist
Hollie Steel (born 1998), English schoolgirl singer
Ian Steel (1928–2015), Scottish racing cyclist
J.A. Steel
James Steel (disambiguation), various people
Jody Steel, American artist
John Steel (disambiguation), various people
Jon Steel
Karen Steel
Kenneth Steel
Kevin Steel
Liam Steel
Louise Steel (archaeologist)
Louise Steel (broadcaster)
Mark Steel (born 1960), English socialist columnist, author and comedian
Melissa Steel
Michelle Steel, American politician
Mike Steel (mathematician)
Nate Steel
Paul Steel
Pippa Steel
Ric Steel
Robert Steel (minister)
Robert Steel (chess player)
Ronald Steel
Ronnie Steel
Thomas B. Steel
Tommy Steel
Trevor Steel
Sam Steel (born 1998) Canadian ice hockey player
Samuel Strang Steel
Scudamore Winde Steel (1789–1865), British army officer of the East India Company
Shawn Steel, American politician and husband of Michelle Steel
Simon Steel (born 1969), English cricketer
William Steel

English-language surnames